Sir Barrington Windsor Cunliffe,  (born 10 December 1939), known as Barry Cunliffe, is a British archaeologist and academic. He was Professor of European Archaeology at the University of Oxford from 1972 to 2007. Since 2007, he has been an emeritus professor.

Biography

Cunliffe's decision to become an archaeologist was sparked at the age of nine by the discovery of Roman remains on his uncle's farm in Somerset. After studying at Portsmouth Northern Grammar School (now the Mayfield School) and reading archaeology and anthropology at St John's College, Cambridge, he became a lecturer at the University of Bristol in 1963. Fascinated by the Roman remains in nearby Bath he embarked on a programme of excavation and publication.

In 1966, he became an unusually young professor when he took the chair at the newly founded Department of Archaeology at the University of Southampton. There he became involved in the excavation (1961–1968) of the Fishbourne Roman Palace in Sussex. Another site in southern England led him away from the Roman period. He began a long series of summer excavations (1969–1988) of the Iron Age hill fort at Danebury, Hampshire and was subsequently involved in the Danebury Environs Programme (1989–1995). His interest in Iron Age Britain and Europe generated a number of publications and he became an acknowledged authority on the Celts.

Other sites he has worked on include Hengistbury Head in Dorset, Mount Batten in Devon, Le Câtel in Jersey, and Le Yaudet in Brittany, reflecting his interest in the communities of Atlantic Europe during the Iron Age. In his later works he sets out the thesis that Celtic culture originated along the length of the Atlantic seaboard in the Bronze Age before being taken inland, which stands in contrast to the more generally accepted view that Celtic origins lie with the Hallstatt culture of the Alps. One of his most recent projects has been in the Najerilla valley, La Rioja, Spain, which straddles "the interface between the Celtiberian heartland of central Iberia and the Atlantic zone of the Bay of Biscay".

Cunliffe was elected as a Fellow of the British Academy in 1979. He lives with his wife in Oxford.

Cunliffe inspired the name for the character "Currant Bunliffe", an archaeologist in David Macaulay's 1979 book, Motel of the Mysteries.

Positions and honours
 President, Council for British Archaeology (1976–1979)
 Fellow of the British Academy (FBA; 1979)
 Member, Ancient Monuments Advisory Committee of English Heritage, since 1984
 Honorary Graduate, Doctor of Science, University of Bath (1984)
 Member, Advisory Committee of The Discovery Programme (Ireland), since  1991
 Commander of the Order of the British Empire (CBE) in the 1994 Birthday Honours for services to archaeology
 Trustee of the British Museum
 Governor, Museum of London
 Fellow of the Society of Antiquaries of London (FSA)
 Original Chair of Steering Committee for the e-journal Internet Archaeology
 Knight Bachelor, 17 June 2006
 Interim chair of English Heritage in September 2008
 Chairman, The British Museum Friends (until 2009)
 Founding Fellow, The Learned Society of Wales
 Grahame Clark Medal of the British Academy (2004)
 Corresponding Member of the Real Academia de la Historia (since 2006)

Works

The Roman Occupation, Introduction, Cumberland and Westmorland, The Buildings of England, Nikolaus Pevsner, Harmondsworth: Penguin (1967)
Roman Hampshire, Introduction, Hampshire and the Isle of Wight, The Buildings of England, Nikolaus Pevsner, Harmondsworth: Penguin (1967)
The Roman Occupation, Introduction, Worcestershire, The Buildings of England, Nikolaus Pevsner, Harmondsworth: Penguin (1968)
Roman Kent, Introduction, North East and East Kent, The Buildings of England, Nikolaus Pevsner, Harmondsworth: Penguin (1969)
Fishbourne: A Roman Palace and Its Garden (1971)

The Regni (1973) in the 'Peoples of Roman Britain series Ed.Keith Brannigan, pub. Duckworth (1973) Iron Age Communities in Britain (1974)  (4th edition, Jan 2005)Excavations in Bath 1950-1975 (1979)Danebury: Anatomy of an Iron Age Hillfort (1983)Roman Bath Discovered (1984)The Celtic World (1987)Greeks, Romans and Barbarians (1988)Wessex to AD 1000 (1993)
 Facing the Ocean: The Atlantic and Its Peoples, 8000 BC to AD 1500 (2001, Oxford University Press)The Oxford Illustrated History of Prehistoric Europe (2001)The Extraordinary Voyage of Pytheas the Greek: The Man Who Discovered Britain (2001), Walker & Co;  (2002 Penguin ed. with new post-script)England's Landscape: The West (English Heritage 2006)Celtic from the West. Alternative perspectives from archaeology, genetics and literature. (Oxford: Oxbow Books). 2010.

References

External links
Sir Barry Cunliffe School of Archaeology, University of Oxford.
Video interview Prof Cunliffe describes the East Gate at Danebury hillfort.Breton, Britons, Celts and King Arthur'' Podcast in which Cunliffe discusses prehistoric links between Brittany and the British Isles (published 26 May 2021).

1939 births
Living people
People from Portsmouth
Archaeologists from Hampshire
Commanders of the Order of the British Empire
Knights Bachelor
Alumni of St John's College, Cambridge
Fellows of Keble College, Oxford
Fellows of the British Academy
Fellows of the Society of Antiquaries of London
Fellows of the Learned Society of Wales
Presidents of the Society of Antiquaries of London
Academics of the University of Bristol
Academics of the University of Southampton
Trustees of the British Museum
Statutory Professors of the University of Oxford
Prehistorians
20th-century archaeologists
21st-century archaeologists
Recipients of the Grahame Clark Medal
Corresponding members of the Real Academia de la Historia